Joanna Dworakowska (born 21 October 1978) is a Polish chess player. She won the Polish women's championship three times – 1997 (before second place Monika Krupa), 1998, 2001 (both times before second place Monika Soćko), and holds the FIDE ranks of International Master and Woman Grandmaster.
She was a member of the Polish women team who won the bronze medal in the 2002 Chess Olympiad at Bled, the gold medal at the 2005 European Team Championship in Gothenburg and a silver medal at the 2007 European Team Championship in Heraklion.

References

External links 
 
 

1978 births
Living people
Polish female chess players
Chess International Masters
Chess woman grandmasters
Sportspeople from Warsaw